Santana do Paraíso is a Brazilian municipality situated in the state of Minas Gerais which was founded in 1992. It forms part of the Vale do Aço metropolitan area. Its estimated population in 2020 was of 35,369 inhabitants.

Before its foundation, Santana do Paraiso's location was a rest spot for people who travelled the road between the cities of Ferros and Coronel Fabriciano. The region is host to the "Cachoeiras de Taquaraçu" (Taquaraçu Waterfalls), in which horses could drink water and travellers could rest near. As time went by, people began building houses on the location, and a city was eventually established, being named Santana do Paraíso in homage to Nossa Senhora de Santana, a local saint.

Economy
The municipality is the less important and less populated of the four main cities of Vale do Aço. Even so, Santana do Paraíso has in its territory some of the region's most important services, as Usiminas Airport and the Queiroz Galvão waste treatment area, that attends the four cities.

Mayors
 Antônio Luiz - 1993
 Helvécio Matias de Oliveira - 1993~1996
 Juarez Antônio da Costa - 1997~2000
 Raimundo Anício Botelho - 2001~2004
 Joaquim Correia de Melo - 2004
 Bruno Morato - 2021

References

External links

Municipalities in Minas Gerais